Christchurch Arena is an indoor arena in Christchurch, New Zealand. It is located in the suburb of Addington. It has gone through a series of name changes, the most recent of which prior to its current name having been Horncastle Arena.

Description 

The arena is New Zealand's second-largest indoor arena with a maximum capacity of 8,888 (depending on event type), it was the largest until the construction of Auckland's Vector Arena in 2007. The indoor stadium is capable of hosting concerts, exhibitions and various sporting events. Provision for international sport and traditional indoor arena events has been integrated into the design requirements.

It has over 6,700 seats for sporting fixtures or, in the concert configuration, the seating can increase to over 7,000.

The Sports and Entertainment complex is located adjacent to the Addington Raceway and Christchurch Stadium and is surrounded by 3,000 car parking spaces. The complex is only 10 minutes from the city centre.

It has been affectionately dubbed 'The Woolshed' by Canterbury Rams basketball fans. Some Christchurch citizens colloquially refer to the arena as the horseshoe, due to its unusual architectural exterior design.

History 
Construction company Chas S Luney Ltd built the stadium. The arena opened in September 1998 at a cost of NZ$32 Million. In the first ever sporting match at CBS Canterbury Arena, the Canterbury Rams basketball team suffered a close loss to the Wellington Saints 86–81 in April 1999.

It was built for two main reasons: primarily for the 1999 Netball World Cup in Christchurch, and also because Christchurch was missing out on many concerts and other attractions, because it did not have a suitable indoor arena in the city.

Sporting home teams 
 Canterbury Rams 1999–2007
 Canterbury Flames 2002–2007
 Mainland Tactix 2008–present

Events

Entertainment events

Sporting 
Since its opening, it has been host to a number of different sporting events. These include home matches for the Canterbury Rams (basketball), New Zealand Breakers (basketball) and Mainland Tactix (netball) teams. It occasionally hosts international basketball and netball fixtures featuring the Tall Blacks and Silver Ferns respectively. It was also the host of the 1999 Netball World Championships.

It has also been host to a lot of non-regular sporting events. These include various celebrity tennis matches, ice shows, disabled games, karate championships and gymnastics competitions.

In 2007 & 2008 the arena hosted WWE professional wrestling tours, featuring the SmackDown and ECW brands. The arena again hosted a WWE event in September 2017, this time a Raw branded event.

Other uses 
The arena plays a key role in the Christchurch economy hosting annual trade shows including the Christchurch Home Show, Women's Lifestyle Expo, Armageddon Expo, and the Go Green Expo.

Christchurch Arena is managed by Venues Otautahi, the same venue management company that manages the Christchurch Town Hall,  Orangetheory Stadium, Airforce Museum of New Zealand and Hagley Oval Pavilion. The combined facilities regularly host a variety of different events

The venue is also used for big gala dinners, lunches, balls, and cocktail parties.

Name change 
On 18 June 2010, Westpac Arena was officially renamed CBS Canterbury Arena.

On 23 July 2014, CBS Canterbury Arena was officially renamed Horncastle Arena.

On 19 September 2020, Horncastle Arena was officially renamed Christchurch Arena.

See also
 List of indoor arenas in New Zealand

References

External links 

 Venues Ōtautahi – venue manager for Christchurch Arena. Lists upcoming events and allows to take a virtual tour of the Arena

1998 establishments in New Zealand
Sports venues in Christchurch
Indoor arenas in New Zealand
Music venues in New Zealand
Boxing venues in New Zealand
Netball venues in New Zealand
Basketball venues in New Zealand
Defunct National Basketball League (Australia) venues
1990s architecture in New Zealand